John Isner was the defending champion but lost in the quarterfinals to David Nalbandian.
David Ferrer won the title, defeating Nalbandian 6–3, 6–2 in the final.

Seeds
The top four seeds receive a bye to the second round.

Qualifying

Draw

Finals

Top half

Bottom half

External links
 Main draw

Heineken Open - Singles
2011 Heineken Open